Gökçe is a village in the Beytüşşebap District of Şırnak Province in Turkey. The village is populated by Kurds of the Mamxûran tribe and had a population of 119 in 2021.

The two hamlets of Çağlar and Karapınar are attached to Gökçe.

References 

Villages in Beytüşşebap District
Kurdish settlements in Şırnak Province